John Fraser (15 September 1938 – 2011) was a footballer from Northern Ireland who played in the Football League for Sunderland, Portsmouth and Watford.

References

1938 births
2011 deaths
Association football wingers
Association footballers from Northern Ireland
Glentoran F.C. players
Sunderland A.F.C. players
Portsmouth F.C. players
Margate F.C. players
Watford F.C. players
Durban City F.C. players
English Football League players